Bezirk Spittal an der Drau is an administrative district (Bezirk) in the state of Carinthia, Austria.

Geography
With an area of the district is 2,763.99 km², it is Austria's second largest district by area (after Liezen), even larger than the Austrian state of Vorarlberg, and by far the largest district in Carinthia. The administrative centre is Spittal an der Drau, other major settlements are Gmünd, Greifenburg, Millstatt, Obervellach, Radenthein, Seeboden, Steinfeld, and Winklern.

Together with the neighbouring districts of Hermagor and Feldkirchen, Spittal forms the Upper Carinthia (Oberkärnten) region according to the Nomenclature of Territorial Units for Statistics (NUTS). It borders on East Tyrol (Lienz District) in the west and the Austrian state of Salzburg in the north.

The mountainous area comprises the southern ranges of the High Tauern and the Möll valley, the western Gurktal Alps (Nock Mountains), as well as the broad Drava Valley and the northern slopes of the Gailtal Alps. The district also includes Millstätter See and Weissensee, two of the major Carinthian lakes.

Administrative divisions
The district is divided into 33 municipalities, three of them are towns and ten of them are market towns.

Towns
 Gmünd (2,605)
 Radenthein (6,620)
 Spittal an der Drau (16,045)

Market towns
 Greifenburg (1,911)
 Lurnfeld (2,718)
 Millstatt (3,351)
 Oberdrauburg (1,334)
 Obervellach (2,540)
 Rennweg am Katschberg (2,025)
 Sachsenburg (1,438)
 Seeboden (6,045)
 Steinfeld (2,291)
 Winklern (1,134)

Municipalities
 Bad Kleinkirchheim (1,863)
 Baldramsdorf (1,819)
 Berg im Drautal (1,373)
 Dellach im Drautal (1,769)
 Flattach (1,373)
 Großkirchheim (1,606)
 Heiligenblut() (1,185)
 Irschen (2,080)
 Kleblach-Lind (1,299)
 Krems in Kärnten (2,157)
 Lendorf (1,776)
 Mallnitz (1,027)
 Malta (2,185)
 Mörtschach (942)
 Mühldorf (963)
 Rangersdorf (1,805)
 Reißeck (2,521)
 Stall (1,868)
 Trebesing (1,263)
 Weißensee (788)

(Population figures as of May 15, 2001)

 
Districts of Carinthia (state)